Mim Persson (born Ida Elisabet Hanna Hilda Sofia Ekelund; 8 November 1902 – 16 November 1982) was a Swedish film actress. She was married to the actor Edvard Persson and co-starred in several films with him.

Selected filmography
 Black Roses (1932)
 South of the Highway (1936)
 Kalle's Inn (1939)
 A Sailor on Horseback (1940)
 Life in the Country (1943)
 Turn of the Century (1944)
 The Happy Tailor (1945)
 Jens Mansson in America (1947)
 Count Svensson (1951)
 The Girl from Backafall (1953)
 Blue Sky (1955)
 When the Mills are Running (1956)

References

Bibliography 
 Qvist, Per Olov & von Bagh, Peter. Guide to the Cinema of Sweden and Finland. Greenwood Publishing Group, 2000.

External links 
 

1902 births
1982 deaths
Swedish film actresses
Swedish silent film actresses
20th-century Swedish actresses
People from Lund